Laura Kolbe (born 9 September 1957) is a Finnish professor of European history at the University of Helsinki. She is also a Helsinki City Council member, representing the Centre Party and the Inspector of Eteläsuomalainen osakunta, student nation representing Southern Finland.

Life and career
Kolbe was born in Bogotá, Colombia, to a German Russian economist father, Boris, and a Finnish journalist mother, . Kolbe earned her M.A. in history at the University of Helsinki and in 1989 she completed her Ph.D. Her thesis, Kulosaari - A Dream of a Better Future (1988) dealt with early suburbanization in Helsinki compared to other Scandinavian capitals, London, and Berlin. From 1983 to 1991 Kolbe worked as a curator for Mannerheim Museum in Helsinki and she is a member in the governing body of the museum. In 1994 Kolbe was appointed Senior Lecturer at the University of Helsinki, teaching urban, social and cultural history as well as the history of ideas. During 1996 to 2000 she worked as an adviser for Eeva Ahtisaari, wife of Martti Ahtisaari, President of Finland.

Bibliography
 Kolbe, Laura, Portraying Finland: Facts and Insights. 2005. Otava. .
 Kolbe, Laura, Ihanuuksien ihmemaa – Suomalaisen itseymmärryksen jäljillä. 2010. Kirjapaja. .
 Kolbe, Laura, Yläluokka – Olemisen sietämätön vaikeus. 2014. Kirjapaja. .

References

External links
 
 Laura Kolbe in 375 humanists 20.1.2015, Faculty of Arts, University of Helsinki

Living people
20th-century Finnish historians
21st-century Finnish women politicians
Centre Party (Finland) politicians
1957 births
Finnish people of German-Russian descent
Finnish curators
Finnish women historians
21st-century Finnish historians